František Jozef Turček (1915 – 1977) ranks among the outstanding personalities in the history of biology in former Czechoslovakia as he was the first Slovak ecologist and the best known Slovak zoologist acknowledged abroad. As a gifted self-made man who had not completed his secondary-school education (however he defended dissertation thesis in 1967 at the Institute of Vertebrate Research CSAS in Brno), he became a highly distinguished scientist of the world importance. A great deal of his creative life he spent working at the Forestry Research Institute, Banská Štiavnica (1946–1964), where, due to his nonconformist attitudes and disinclination to collaborate with leading Communist regime, he was discriminated. This was why he transferred to the Slovak Academy of Sciences in 1964, where he was fully acknowledged.

Dr. Turček’s publication activity was remarkable. He wrote 13 books and published more than 450 articles in Czechoslovak as well as in German, Hungarian, Swedish, British, American, Indian and Japanese journals. He corresponded with the well-known specialists in the world ecology at that time (Balogh, Dehnel, Formozov, Kendeigh, Novikov, Pinowski, Tischler and others) and was a member and corresponding fellow of several international scientific organizations (Magyar Madártani Intézet, British Ornithologists’ Union, American Ornithologists’ Union, International Union of Applied Ornithology, Deutsche Gesellschaft für Säugetierkunde, The Cooper Ornithological Society. In 1964, the International Organization of Zoologists, the Academy of Zoology in Agra (India), appointed him the vice-president.

References

Czechoslovak zoologists
1915 births
1977 deaths